Jérôme Sykora (born 14 April 1971) is a former professional footballer who played as a goalkeeper.

External links
Jérôme Sykora profile at chamoisfc79.fr

1971 births
Living people
French footballers
Association football goalkeepers
Montpellier HSC players
FC Gueugnon players
Chamois Niortais F.C. players
C.D. Nacional players
Ligue 1 players
Ligue 2 players
Pau FC players